Power of Veto may refer to:

 Veto, in general
 United Nations Security Council veto power
 Power of Veto in the reality TV series Big Brother